was a Fudai feudal domain under the Tokugawa shogunate of  Edo period Japan.  It was located in southeastern Ōmi Province, in the Kansai region of central Honshu. The domain was centered at Nisshōji jin'ya, located in what is now the town of  Hino in Shiga Prefecture.

History
Hino was the location of Nakano Castle, a stronghold of Gamō Ujisato during the Sengoku period. The castle was abandoned after the Battle of Sekigahara. In 1620, Ichihashi Nagamasa, a former retainer of Oda Nobunaga who had entered into the service of Tokugawa Ieyasu and who had distinguished himself at the Siege of Osaka, was established as daimyō of the newly-created Nisshōji Domain  with a kokudaka of 20,000 koku. He built a  jin'ya on the ruins of the old Nakano Castle. In 1622, he gave 2000 koku to his younger son, Ichihashi Nagayoshi, to establish a cadet branch of the clan, reducing the domain to 18,000 koku. His son, the second daimyō Ishibashi Masanobu likewise awarded 1000 koku to his son, Ishihashi Masanao, reducing the domain further to 17,000 koku.

During the Bakumatsu period, the 10th daimyō, Ishibashi Nagakazu, was a supporter of the Shogunate and attempted to manufacture gunpowder in the domain. However, with the start of the Boshin War, he changed his fealty to the imperial cause and served in the guard for Emperor Meiji. As with all domains, Nishiōji Domain was abolished in 1870 with the abolition of the han system. It subsequently was incorporated into Nishiōji prefecture, Ōtsu Prefecture, and then Shiga Prefecture.

Most of the remains of Nisshōji jin'ya were destroyed by the construction of Hinogawa Dam, but some remnants of stone walls and moats of the main enclosure survive near the Ryohashi Jinja and Inari Jinja. The main building of the jin'ya itself was used the Nisshōji Elementary School in the Meiji period. In 1918, it was dismantled and sold to Shōkoku-ji in Kyoto and rebuilt for use at its sub-temple Rinko-in.

Bakumatsu period holdings
As with most domains in the han system, Nisshōji Domain consisted of a discontinuous territories calculated to provide the assigned kokudaka, based on periodic cadastral surveys and projected agricultural yields.

Ōmi Province
3 villages in Yasu District
27 villages in Gamō District

List of daimyō

  Ichihashi clan (Tozama) 1620-1871

See also
List of Han

References
The content of this article was largely derived from that of the corresponding article on Japanese Wikipedia.

Notes

Domains of Japan
1620s establishments in Japan
History of Shiga Prefecture
Ōmi Province
Hino, Shiga